The Sultanate of Bale was a Somali Muslim sultanate founded in the Bale Mountains of the southern Ethiopian Highlands and Horn of Africa. It corresponds roughly to the modern Bale Zone of the Oromia Region in Ethiopia.

History

Establishment
The Bale Sultanate was founded in the 13th century by Sheikh Hussein who came from the Hawiye town of Merca one of the commercial and Islamic centers in the Indian Ocean He is credited for introducing Islam to the Sidamo people living in the area at the time. Despite the Sultanate being founded by a Somali saint and ruled by his descendants, the kingdom was mostly inhabited by the Sidama people. Ajuran merchants began settling in the region, thus linking the two kingdoms economically as Bale had trade with other Ethiopian kingdoms and would serve as the gateway for the Ajuran Sultanate.

Along with other sultanates, including Dawaro, Arababni,  Hadiya, Shirka, and Dara, Bale became part of the so-called confederation of Zeila.

Location 

It bordered the sultanates of Dawaro and Shirka in the north,  Hadiya in the west, and Adal in the east and its core areas were located around the Wabe Shebelle River.

Economy 

During medieval times Bale was known for its production of cotton, while salt brought from El Kere was an important trading item

Military encounters 

Bale was conquered by Amde Seyon in the 1320s and would remain under Abyssinian occupation until Adal Sultan Ahmeduddin Badlay's victory over Emperor Yeshaq I in 1429.

Fall of Bale 

As a result of the wars of Ahmad ibn Ibrahim al-Ghazi between 1529 and 1549, and the subsequent Oromo migration from the 1540s, native Muslims lost their foothold in Bale.

References

Bale
Medieval Ethiopia
Bale Mountains
Countries in medieval Africa